Michal Sivek (born January 21, 1981) is a Czech former professional ice hockey player. He played 38 games in the National Hockey League with the Pittsburgh Penguins during the 2002–03 season. The rest of his career, which lasted from 1997 to 2008, was mainly spent in the Czech Extraliga. Internationally Sivek played for the Czech national junior team in several tournaments, including three World Junior Championships, winning two gold medals.

Playing career
On October 1, 2001, Sivek was one of three players traded from the Washington Capitals for Jaromír Jágr from the Pittsburgh Penguins. He made his NHL debut the following season with the Penguins on November 30, 2002, against the Buffalo Sabres.

Sivek retired after the 2007-08 season due to unspecified health issues.

International play

Sivek played for the Czech national junior team in several tournaments. He won a gold medal at both the 2000 and 2001 World Junior Championships.

Post-retirement
He is now a player-agent for Eurohockey Services, co-managing the agency with former Pittsburgh Penguins teammate Vladimír Vůjtek.

Career statistics

Regular season and playoffs

International

References

External links
 

1981 births
Living people
Czech ice hockey centres
HC Sparta Praha players
People from Náchod
Pittsburgh Penguins players
Prince Albert Raiders players
Rytíři Kladno players
Sportspeople from the Hradec Králové Region
Washington Capitals draft picks
Wilkes-Barre/Scranton Penguins players
Czech expatriate ice hockey players in the United States
Czech expatriate ice hockey players in Canada
Sports agents